The Far Side is a comic strip by Gary Larson.

Far Side may also refer to:

Gary Larson's Tales from the Far Side, a 1994 television special based on Larson's comic strip
Far Side (album), a 2010 album by Roscoe Mitchell and the Note Factory
Farside (band), melodic hardcore band
The Pharcyde, an alternative hip hop act
The Far Side, a play by Courttia Newland

See also
Far side of the Moon, the hemisphere of Earth's moon that is oriented away from the Earth
Far Side of the Moon (film), a 2003 Canadian film by Robert Lepage